Populus simonii, Simon's poplar, Simon poplar, or Chinese cottonwood, is a species of poplar native to northeast China and to Mongolia, and commonly planted as a street tree in cool temperate areas of Europe. There have been introductions into North America, South Africa, Australia and New Zealand.

References

simonii
Ornamental trees
Plants described in 1867
Taxa named by Élie-Abel Carrière